Oxychona bifaciata is a species of  tropical air-breathing land snail, a pulmonate gastropod mollusk in the family Bulimulidae.

References

Oxychona
Gastropods described in 1815